No free lunch with vanishing risk (NFLVR) is a no-arbitrage argument.  We have free lunch with vanishing risk if by utilizing a sequence of time self-financing portfolios, which converge to an arbitrage strategy, we can approximate a self-financing portfolio (called the free lunch with vanishing risk).

Mathematical representation
For a semimartingale S, let  where a strategy is admissible if it is permitted by the market. Then define .

Fundamental theorem of asset pricing

If  is a semimartingale with values in  then S does not allow for a free lunch with vanishing risk if and only if there exists an equivalent martingale measure  such that S is a sigma-martingale under .

References

Arbitrage
Financial markets
Mathematical finance